Base Feeder is a Microsoft Windows based utility to create Atom and RSS XML feed files for submission to Google Base.

To bulk submit items, you need to create and submit a specially formatted XML file. One can use software like Base Feeder to create the XML files for submission to Google Base.

Base Feeder comes in 2 different flavors:

 For Recipes
 For Products

Base Feeder is a proprietary software program priced at about $40. The "Products" edition is priced at $65.

Content management systems